"The Greatest View" is a song by Australian rock band Silverchair, released on 28 January 2002 as the first single from their fourth studio album, Diorama. This is one of three songs which made it onto the album (the other two being "World Upon Your Shoulders" and "Too Much of Not Enough") which Daniel Johns recorded using his Rickenbacker 12 string.

"The Greatest View" peaked at  3 in Australia and at No. 4 in Canada and New Zealand. In 2008, it reached No. 36 on the US Billboard Modern Rock Tracks chart due to an EP being released by Warner Bros. Records. The Square-Eyed Films directed music video was nominated for Best Video at the ARIA Music Awards of 2002.

Origin
In an interview with the Associated Press in 2002, Daniel Johns said about the song:
"The Greatest View" is a song that really focuses on people's perceptions of the same problem or the same scenario. Basically what was going on in my mind was that I had a lot of people who were watching over me and watching my every move making sure that I didn't fall back in to the heap that I fell in to whilst writing Neon Ballroom. Because I was aware of that I felt like I had the greatest view from where I was from because I could see what was going on. I was aware of the situation, I was in control of my own destiny really."

Music video
A video was made in which the band plays in hotel room representing Daniel Johns' inner space which spies try to investigate and listen in on. At the end of the video, the whole hotel lifts up into the air playing on the words 'greatest view'. The music video was directed by Sean Gilligan and Sarah-Jane Woulahan from the Brisbane-based video team Squareyed Films.

Director Sean Gilligan uploaded a high definition version of the music video to his YouTube channel on 19 April 2020.

Track listings

Australian CD single 
 "The Greatest View"
 "Pins in My Needles"
 "Too Much of Not Enough"

UK CD and 7-inch single 
 "The Greatest View" (radio version) – 3:41
 "Asylum" – 4:30
 "Pins in My Needles" – 3:07

European and Canadian CD single 
 "The Greatest View" (radio version) – 3:40
 "Asylum" – 4:28

US digital EP – 2007
 "The Greatest View" – 4:05
 "Straight Lines" (The Presets Remix) – 3:53
 "We're Not Lonely... But We Miss You" – 3:34
 "Barbarella" – 3:14
 "If You Keep Losing Sleep" (video) – 3:22
 "The Greatest View" (video—live from Carriageworks, Sydney)

Charts

Weekly charts

Year-end charts

Certifications

Release history

References

External links
 
 
 

2002 singles
2002 songs
Atlantic Records singles
Eleven: A Music Company singles
Silverchair songs
Song recordings produced by David Bottrill
Songs written by Daniel Johns
Virgin Records singles